Antiguraleus galatea is a species of sea snail, a marine gastropod mollusk in the family Mangeliidae.

Description
The length of the shell attains 5 mm, its diameter 2.4 mm.

Distribution
This marine species occurs of West Transkei, South Africa

References

  Kilburn, R. N. "Turridae (Mollusca: Gastropoda) of southern Africa and Mozambique. Part 7. Subfamily Crassispirinae, section 2." Annals of the Natal Museum 35.1 (1994): 177-228.

External links
  Tucker, J.K. 2004 Catalog of recent and fossil turrids (Mollusca: Gastropoda). Zootaxa 682:1-1295.

Endemic fauna of South Africa
galatea
Gastropods described in 1994